Finding the Fox is a fantasy/science fiction novel by Ali Sparkes. It is the first book in The Shapeshifter series, and was first published in 2006 by Oxford University Press.

Themes and topics 
The book explores such themes such as familial abuse, emotional repression, government suspicion, found family and absentee parenthood.

Publication history
As with all of the Shapeshifter books, Finding the Fox was published by Oxford University Press in 2006.

Recognition
Finding the Fox was nominated for the 2007 Bolton Children's Book Award, the Dutch Kinderboekenweek, and was awarded the number one book in 2002.

References

External links

 Finding the Fox at OUP
 Ali Sparkes at OUP
 Ali Sparkes's official page on the series

2006 British novels
English fantasy novels
Fiction about shapeshifting
Books about foxes
The Shapeshifter
Oxford University Press books